André Tomes Balazs (born January 31, 1957) is an American businessman and hotelier. He is president and chief executive officer of André Balazs Properties, a portfolio of hotels across the United States and residences in New York state, especially in New York City.

Early life and education
Balazs was born in Boston, Massachusetts. His father, Endre Alexander Balazs, was a research professor at Harvard Medical School, founded the Retina Foundation and the Boston Biomedical Research Institute, and was the director of ophthalmic research at Columbia-Presbyterian Medical Center. His mother, Eva K. Balazs, was a family therapist and psychologist at McLean Hospital. Also a musician, she later helped form the New New Orleans Jazz Band.

Balazs graduated from Buckingham, Browne & Nichols School, a private preparatory school in Cambridge, Massachusetts. He graduated from Cornell University and was a member of the Quill and Dagger society. Balazs also attended the Columbia University Graduate School of Journalism where he earned a joint master's degree in journalism and business.

Career
In 1980, Balazs was hired by David Garth Associates to serve as Press Secretary to Bess Myerson, a Democratic candidate for Senator from New York State.

Balazs co-founded Biomatrix with his father in 1988. The biotechnology company developed six hyaluronan products before it was sold in 2000 to Genzyme for an estimated $738 million.

Between 1988 and 1989, Balazs invested in various projects including the Manhattan nightclub M.K. and the Los Angeles supper club b.c. In 1989 he purchased The Mercer Hotel property in SoHo, a 100-year-old manufacturing loft. In 1990, Balazs purchased and restored the Chateau Marmont. Built in 1929 and located on Sunset Boulevard, Balazs reportedly paid just over $12 million. In 1997, he purchased and updated the Sunset Beach Hotel and Restaurant on Shelter Island. The following year, Balazs opened the redeveloped Mercer Hotel and Mercer Kitchen in SoHo.

In 1998, Balazs opened the first of five hotels called The Standard in West Hollywood. Balazs subsequently opened and operated five Standard hotels: in Hollywood, Downtown Los Angeles, Miami, and two in New York City, before selling his interests in the real estate, and in the management company in 2017.

Balazs has placed a strong focus on the culinary programs for each of his properties. The restaurants at the properties include the Standard Grill at The Standard, New York; The Lido Restaurant and Bayside Grill at The Standard Spa, Miami and Sunset Beach; Bar Marmont and the terrace restaurant at Chateau Marmont with Carolynn Spence; and The Standard Biergartens in New York and Downtown LA with Kurt Gutenbrunner.

In 2007, Balazs began a collaboration with Wölffer Estate Vineyard on Long Island to create his own vintage of rosé.

In 2011, Balazs launched a sea plane service to the Hamptons from Manhattan.

In 2012, Balazs started The Farm at Locusts-on-Hudson on the grounds of the former Astor family estate he purchased in Hyde Park, New York, to grow organic produce for his New York restaurants.

He also owns the Chiltern Firehouse, a hotel in a former fire station in London. Chiltern Firehouse was designed in conjunction with Studio KO, though Balazs is personally involved in the design of his hotels and it includes bar areas, a restaurant and suites.

Balazs has also been involved in residential real estate as the developer of 15 William, condominium in New York City's Financial District.

In June 2021, Balazs reportedly sold his four-bedroom, 4,200-square-foot Soho loft property on the 10th-floor at the New Museum Building at 158 Mercer St. The property was sold for $10.35 million. According to city records, Balazs bought the property for $5.75 million in 2003.

During 2023, Balazs partnered with Experiential hospitality group Habitas, to open Habitas's seventh location and first U.S. location. The hotel, located two-hours from New York in Rhinebeck. The property was purchased by Balazs prior to the pandemic with the aims of opening a new hotel, the property includes 30 guest rooms, a restaurant and bar, swimmable pond, hikihg and biking trails and saunas. A stay within the property will cost around $450 per night.

Boards and awards
Balazs was recruited by Andy Warhol in 1982 to be one of the founding Trustees of the New York Academy of Art. He has served on the boards of the New York Public Theater and the Wolfsonian Museum affiliated with Florida International University. He was awarded the first Design Patrons Award in 2011 by the National Academy of Arts’ Cooper-Hewitt Museum of Design in New York City.

In 2014, Balazs was the recipient of British GQ’s “Men of the Year” award in the category of entrepreneur.

Personal life

Relationships
Balazs married Katie Ford on November 16, 1985; they divorced in 2004. They have two daughters, Alessandra (born 1991) and Isabel (born 1994). He was engaged to actress Uma Thurman between 2004 and 2007, and the couple again dated from 2015 to 2016. He also had a relationship with comedian Chelsea Handler from 2011 to 2013.

His girlfriend, Cosima Vesey, the daughter of Sita-Maria de Breffny and Thomas Vesey, 7th Viscount de Vesci, gave birth to a son with Balazs, Ivo Vesey, on July 9, 2017.

Art collection
In 2007, Christie's announced that Balazs was the winning bidder in an auction for Jean Prouvé's Maison Tropicale; Balazs reportedly paid $4.97 million for the house.

Controversy
In 2017, the New York Times reported allegations that Balazs had "groped" Amanda Anka in London at a dinner hosted by him for Jennifer Aniston and Justin Theroux, a pattern of sexual misconduct dating back to at least the early 1990s. A statement issued by Amanda Anka and her husband, Jason Bateman, said that "his actions were dealt with at the time."

References

Further reading

External links

1957 births
Living people
American hoteliers
American real estate businesspeople
Columbia University Graduate School of Journalism alumni
Cornell University alumni
Hungarian emigrants to the United States
Businesspeople from Cambridge, Massachusetts
American chief executives of travel and tourism industry companies
Columbia Business School alumni